Bernard Waters (1852–1911), also known as Benjamin Waters, was an American sportsman, professional dog trainer, field trial judge, conservationist, editor, reporter and author who wrote a number of books about sporting dogs under the pen name "Kingrail" around the turn of the 19th/20th centuries.

Mr. Waters was a member of the handicap committee at the 1900 Grand American trap shoot and was employed as an editor by Forest and Stream Publishing Company (forerunner of Field & Stream magazine), which was located at 318 Broadway in New York City.

Publications

Books
Modern Training, Handling and Kennel Management, Chicago, The Blakely Printing Co., 1889, 373p
The American Book of the Dog, Chicago and New York, Rand, McNally and Company, 1891, 702 p
Training and Handling of the Dog, Boston, Little Brown, 1894, 332p
Modern Training and Handling, Boston, J. Loring Thayer Publishing Co, 1894, 332p.  
Fetch and Carry, a Treatise on Retrieving, New York, Forest and Stream Publishing Company, 1895, 124p. 
Training the Hunting Dog for the Field and Field Trials, New York, Forest and Stream Publishing Company, 1st edition 1901, 2nd edition 1908, 281p.

Periodicals
Outing Magazine
Field Trials of Setters and Pointers. Outing, September 1902, Vol. XXXX, No. 6 pp. 728–732
The New York Dog Show. The Sporting Classes. Outing, April, 1903, Vol. XLII, No. 1, p. 130-131
Sporting Life
Wildwood's Magazine

References

External links
Complete text of "The American Book of the Dog" on Internet Archive
Complete text of "Modern Training and Handling" at GoogleBooks

1846 births
1911 deaths
American non-fiction writers
Date of birth unknown
Burials at Kensico Cemetery